Marco Riccioni (Teramo, 19 October 1997) is an Italian rugby union prop who currently plays for Saracens and Italy. 

Riccioni played with Italian Pro14 team Benetton from 2017 to 2021.
He joins Saracens ahead of the 2021–22 season. 

From 2015 to 2017, Riccioni was named in the Italy Under 20 squad.  On 18 August 2019, he was named in the final 31-man squad for the 2019 Rugby World Cup.

International tries

References

External links

1997 births
Living people
Italian rugby union players
Italy international rugby union players
Rugby Calvisano players
Benetton Rugby players
Rugby union props
Saracens F.C. players
People from Teramo